DXCE (95.7 FM), broadcasting as 95.7 Brigada News FM, is a radio station owned and operated by Brigada Mass Media Corporation. Its studios are located at the 2nd Floor, Janro Glass Bldg., General Santos Dr., Koronadal, and its transmitter is located at Brgy. Paraiso, Koronadal.

Formerly owned by Hypersonic Broadcasting Center, Brigada News FM was inaugurated on February 18, 2013. This is the second Brigada station after its flagship station in General Santos. In less than a year, it easily gained wide listenership. As per 2015 KBP-Kantar Media Survey, it is ranked as the over-all #1 Radio Station in Koronadal.

References

Radio stations in South Cotabato
Radio stations established in 2013